The solo discography of Slash (born Saul Hudson), an American-English hard rock and heavy metal guitarist, comprises five studio albums, three live albums, two extended play (EP), 10 singles, and two video album. Slash has also featured on 12 singles by other artists, released ten music videos, and made contributions to numerous other releases.

After leaving the band Guns N' Roses in 1996 due to internal tensions with frontman Axl Rose, guitarist Slash experimented briefly with solo projects Slash's Blues Ball and Slash's Snakepit (the latter of which released two albums), before forming Velvet Revolver in 2002 with former Guns N' Roses bandmates Duff McKagan and Matt Sorum. Along with frontman Scott Weiland and rhythm guitarist Dave Kushner, the supergroup released two successful albums, Contraband in 2004 and Libertad in 2007, before Weiland was fired in 2008 and the band went on indefinite hiatus.

Recording for Slash's debut solo album began in September 2008 with different singers being enlisted for each song, including Ozzy Osbourne and The Black Eyed Peas vocalist Fergie. The resulting album, simply titled Slash, was released in April 2010, and debuted at number three on the US Billboard 200 albums chart. Preceding the release of the album, Slash had released the Japan-only single "Sahara", featuring Japanese vocalist Koshi Inaba. It charted at number four on the Oricon Singles Chart, as well number six on the Billboard Japan Hot 100 and number four on the Top Singles Sales chart. It has been awarded Western "Single of the Year" award at the 24th Japan Gold Disc Award by RIAJ. The three international single releases from Slash were "By the Sword" featuring Wolfmother frontman Andrew Stockdale, "Back from Cali" featuring Alter Bridge frontman Myles Kennedy – both of which charted on the Billboard Mainstream Rock chart – and the Fergie-featured "Beautiful Dangerous", which reached number 11 on the Billboard Top Heatseekers chart.

Myles Kennedy was chosen to front Slash's solo band for the resulting promotional tour, and just a few months later Live in Manchester, a live album documenting the group's performance at the Manchester Academy in July 2010, was released. The following year, Made in Stoke 24/7/11 was released as a live album and video, which documented the band's performance at the Victoria Hall in Stoke-on-Trent, his childhood hometown, in July 2011. The release reached number eight on the Billboard Hard Rock Albums chart, and also charted in Austria, Germany, and Switzerland.

In 2012, with Kennedy now a permanent part of his band, Slash released his second solo album Apocalyptic Love, which reached a peak position of number four on the Billboard 200. The lead single, "You're a Lie", topped the Mainstream Rock chart, while other album tracks "Standing in the Sun" and "Anastasia" later made it into the top ten of the chart as well. As of April 2014, Slash is recording his third solo album with Kennedy and their band The Conspirators (Todd Kerns and Brent Fitz).

Studio albums

Soundtracks

Live albums

Extended plays

Singles

As lead artist

As featured artist

Other charted songs

Other appearances

Studio appearances

Guest appearances

Video albums

Music videos

See also
Guns N' Roses discography
Slash's Snakepit
Velvet Revolver discography

References

Rock music discographies
Discographies of American artists
Discography